Johann Nepomuk Paul Oischinger (13 May 1817 – 11 December 1876) was a German Roman Catholic theologian and philosopher who was a native of Witzmannsberg, Bavaria.

Oischinger studied theology and philosophy at the University of Munich, where he had as instructors Franz Xaver von Baader (1765-1841), Joseph Görres (1776-1848), Friedrich Wilhelm Joseph Schelling (1775-1854), Ignaz von Döllinger (1799-1890), Heinrich Klee (1800-1840), Johann Adam Möhler (1796-1838) and Franz Xaver Reithmayr (1809-1872). In 1841 he received his ordination in Regensburg, and shortly afterwards returned to Munich, where he worked as a private scholar and journalist for the remainder of his career.

His aim in theology was to create a new philosophical system and a scientific offering of Catholic doctrinal concepts, and with the new system he proposed the elimination of what he considered erroneous medieval scholastic features. A number of his writings were harsh criticisms of medieval scholastic theology, in particular the belief system of Thomas Aquinas. He was also the author of polemical writings aimed at contemporary movements that included Neo-Scholasticism and Güntherianism. A few of his numerous publications are as follows:
 Grundriss zu einem neuen Systeme der Philosophie (Framework of a New System of Philosophy), 1843
 Philosophie und Religion (1849)
 Grundriss zum systeme der christlichen Philosophie (Framework for a System of Christian Philosophy), 1852
 Die Einheitslehre der göttlichen Trinität (Doctrine of the Anthropomorphic Trinity), 1869

References 
  English translation

1817 births
1876 deaths
People from Passau (district)
German philosophers
19th-century German Catholic theologians
19th-century German male writers
19th-century German writers
German male non-fiction writers
Clergy from Bavaria